On 14 May 1961, during the American Civil Rights Movement, a mob of Ku Klux Klan members attacked civil rights Freedom Riders in Birmingham, Alabama after two buses were setting out to travel the south in protest of their civil rights following the Supreme Court case saying bus segregation was unconstitutional.

Attack 

When the bus arrived in Birmingham, Alabama, it was attacked by a mob of Ku Klux Klan members aided and abetted by police under the orders of Commissioner Bull Connor. As the riders exited the bus, they were beaten by the mob with baseball bats, iron pipes and bicycle chains. Among the attacking Klansmen was Gary Thomas Rowe, an FBI informant. White Freedom Riders were singled out for especially frenzied beatings; James Peck required more than 50 stitches to the wounds in his head.
 Peck was taken to Carraway Methodist Medical Center, which refused to treat him; he was later treated at Jefferson Hillman Hospital.

When reports of the bus burning and beatings reached US Attorney General Robert F. Kennedy, he urged restraint on the part of Freedom Riders and sent an assistant, John Seigenthaler, to Alabama to try to calm the situation.

Despite the violence suffered and the threat of more to come, the Freedom Riders intended to continue their journey. Kennedy had arranged an escort for the Riders in order to get them to Montgomery, Alabama, safely. However, radio reports told of a mob awaiting the riders at the bus terminal, as well as on the route to Montgomery. The Greyhound clerks told the Riders that their drivers were refusing to drive any Freedom Riders anywhere.

See also 

 Anniston bus bombing

References 

 
1961 in American politics
1961 protests
African-American history of Alabama
Bus transportation in the United States
Civil rights movement
Civil rights protests in the United States
History of African-American civil rights
History of the Southern United States
May 1961 events in North America
Ku Klux Klan crimes in Alabama